Francisco Rebolo Gonsales, widely known as Francisco Rebolo, or just Rebolo (August 22, 1902 in São Paulo – July 10, 1980 in São Paulo), was a Brazilian painter. He was a son of Spanish immigrants that arrived at Brasil in the end of 19th century.

Biography 

He lived intensely two different life paths: he was a football player (soccer player, in United States terms), from 1917 a 1932. He played for Corinthians, from  1921 to 1927, and for Ypiranga after that. Both have their headquarters in São Paulo city. From 1934 on, he became a painter.

He was founder of Grupo Santa Helena, together with Fulvio Pennacchi, Aldo Bonadei, Humberto Rosa, Manuel Martins, Clóvis Graciano, Mario Zanini, Alfredo Volpi and Alfredo Rizzotti.

Rebolo is considered as one of the most important landscape painters of Brazilian art. His work is estimated in more than 3.000 paintings, hundreds of drawings, and a set of fifty engraving images. Besides landscapes, he also had an important work with portraits and still life paintings, particularly of flowers. Nowadays, Rebolo works figure in the main Brazilian museums, in the collection catalog of cultural and governmental organizations, as well as in privately held collections all over Brazil.

Rebolo was also the creator of the coat of arms of the Sport Club Corinthians Paulista, drawn in the 1930s.

References

  Obras de Rebolo, or "Works by Rebolo"
  Obras de Rebolo, or "Works by Rebolo"
  Relatório Fapesp 2005, or "FAPESP 2005 Report"
  Site Oficial, or "Francisco Rebolo Official Homepage"

See also

List of Brazilian painters

1902 births
1980 deaths
Brazilian footballers
Modern artists
Brazilian people of Spanish descent
20th-century Brazilian painters
20th-century Brazilian male artists
Association footballers not categorized by position